Phenestrol, or fenestrol, also known as hexestrol bis[4-[bis(2-chloroethyl)amino]phenylacetate, is a synthetic, nonsteroidal estrogen and cytostatic antineoplastic agent (i.e., chemotherapy drug) and a chlorphenacyl nitrogen mustard ester of hexestrol which was developed in the early 1960s for the treatment of hormone-dependent tumors but was never marketed.

See also
 List of hormonal cytostatic antineoplastic agents
 List of estrogen esters

References

Abandoned drugs
Antineoplastic drugs
Carboxylate esters
Estrogen esters
Hormonal antineoplastic drugs
Nitrogen mustards
Phenols
Synthetic estrogens
Chloroethyl compounds